Matthew ("Matt") David Mileham (born 27 December 1956 in London) is a male retired male hammer thrower from Great Britain.

Athletics career
Mileham represented Great Britain at two consecutive Summer Olympics, starting in Los Angeles in 1984 and the 1988 Summer Olympics.

He represented England in the hammer event, at the 1986 Commonwealth Games in Edinburgh, Scotland.

Personal life
A student at California State University, Fresno he later worked as an electrical engineer. His American wife, Dr. Lacy Barnes-Mileham, who also attended Fresno State, was a discus thrower at the Summer Olympics in Atlanta in 1996

Achievements

References

 British Olympic Committee
 Short profile

1956 births
Living people
British male hammer throwers
Athletes (track and field) at the 1984 Summer Olympics
Athletes (track and field) at the 1988 Summer Olympics
Athletes (track and field) at the 1986 Commonwealth Games
Olympic athletes of Great Britain
Athletes from London
California State University, Fresno alumni
Commonwealth Games competitors for England